Damsgaard is a surname of Danish origin, meaning "pond farmstead". Notable people with the surname include:

Mikael Damsgaard (born 1976), Swedish politician
Mikkel Damsgaard (born 2000), Danish professional footballer
Tobias Damsgaard (born 1998), Danish footballer

See also
Damgaard